Scappoose Airport  is a public use airport located one nautical mile (1.85 km) northeast of the central business district of Scappoose, in Columbia County, Oregon, United States. It is owned and operated by the Port of Columbia County, an Oregon port district and municipal corporation, on behalf of district residents. According to the FAA's National Plan of Integrated Airport Systems for 2009–2013, it is categorized as a general aviation airport.

Although many U.S. airports use the same three-letter location identifier for the FAA and IATA, this airport is assigned SPB by the FAA but has no designation from the IATA (which assigned SPB to
Charlotte Amalie Harbor Seaplane Base in Charlotte Amalie, Saint Thomas, U.S. Virgin Islands).

Several privately held firms in the general aviation manufacturing industry are headquartered at the Scappoose Airport.

Facilities and aircraft 
It has one runway designated 15/33 with an asphalt surface measuring 5,100 by 100 feet (1,554 x 30 m).

For the 12-month period ending April 29, 2009, the airport had 75,500 aircraft operations, an average of 206 per day: 93% general aviation, 7% air taxi, and <1% military. At that time there were 57 aircraft based at this airport: 75% single-engine, 2% multi-engine, 2% helicopter and 21% ultralight.

References

External links
 Scappoose Airport
 Port of Columbia County
 Aerial image as of 5 August 2000 from USGS The National Map
 

Airports in Columbia County, Oregon
Scappoose, Oregon